Heat shock protein family A (Hsp70) member 12B is a protein that in humans is encoded by the HSPA12B gene.

Function

The protein encoded by this gene contains an atypical heat shock protein 70 (Hsp70) ATPase domain and is therefore a distant member of the mammalian Hsp70 family. This gene may be involved in susceptibility to atherosclerosis. Alternative splicing results in multiple transcript variants encoding different isoforms. [provided by RefSeq, Dec 2015].

References

Further reading